Hoseynabad-e Qarqalu (also Romanized as Ḩoseynābād-e Qārqālū; also known as Ḩoseynābād, Ḩoseynābād-e Qārqālī, Karkali, and Qārqāli) is a village in Howmeh Rural District, in the Central District of Abhar County, Zanjan Province, Iran. At the 2006 census, its population was 52, in 10 families.

References 

Populated places in Abhar County